Barrack Field is located on the grounds of the Royal Artillery Barracks in Woolwich, southeast London (formerly part of Kent). It was once part of Woolwich Common, then used as a venue for cricket matches in the 18th century and as the home of Woolwich Cricket Club at that time. Later it became the home of the Royal Artillery Cricket Club. It is now used as a generic sports field, mainly for football.

History 
Woolwich Cricket Club came briefly to prominence in August 1754 when the team played home and away games against Dartford, at this time was probably the strongest team in England.

The club revived in the last ten years of the 18th century when, following the establishment of Marylebone Cricket Club in 1787, club cricket was very fashionable in London and matches between the town clubs were very popular. Barrack Field was frequently used for matches in this period.

Cricket venue
At least 800 matches took place on the ground, mostly services fixtures.

It is possible that Woolwich Cricket Club was merged into the Royal Artillery Cricket Club (RACC) or alternatively that it disbanded after the RACC took full possession of Barrack Field. According to its own website, RACC first played cricket in 1765, having been started as a private club by Royal Artillery officers. It was formally constituted as a regimental club as late as 1906.  The Royal Artillery Cricket Club, now plays at the Sharp Cricket Ground in Larkhill Garrison.

References 

 

Woolwich
Cricket grounds in London
Defunct sports venues in London
Defunct cricket grounds in England
English cricket venues in the 18th century
1754 establishments in England
Sports venues completed in 1754